Eritrean Americans are an ethnic group (or hyphenated ethnicity) of  Americans who are of full or partial Eritrean national origin, heritage and/or ancestry. As of 2013, there are 33,930 Eritrean-born citizens living in the U.S.

History

Eritrea regain its independence from Ethiopia on May 24, 1991, after the Eritrean War of Independence. Since the inception of the war in the 1960s,  many immigrants from Eritrea left for the United States. By 2000, the Eritrean community in the U.S. had grown to around 30,000 members.

Eritrean Americans have since established ethnic enclaves in various places around the country, particularly in the Washington D.C. area. Fairfax Avenue in Los Angeles, California has come to be known as Little Ethiopia, owing to its many Ethiopian and Eritrean businesses and restaurants. The Temescal neighborhood of Oakland, California has many Ethiopian and Eritrean businesses and restaurants. Additionally, Eritreans have opened a number of garages and auto repair shops. They also run several taxi establishments, including the Eritrean Cab company based in San Diego. Also the 100% Eritrean owned Indy Airport Taxi located in Indianapolis, Indiana.

Demographics
The exact number of Eritrean residents in the United States is unknown because Eritreans were Ethiopian nationals prior to Eritrea's independence in the early 1990s. According to the U.S. Census Bureau, approximately 18,917 people reported Eritrean ancestry in 2000. Between 2007 and 2011, there were approximately 25,848 Eritrea-born residents in the country. California had the most Eritrean-born people, at 4,782 residents, followed by Virginia (3,417), Texas (2,693), and Maryland (1,902).

Most Eritrean immigrants are concentrated in Washington D.C., Arizona and California, especially the San Francisco Bay Area. The community also has a notable presence in the Seattle, Columbus, Minneapolis, Chicago, New York, Atlanta, Houston, Denver and Dallas metropolitan areas.

Community organizations

The Eritrean community in the United States is represented by various Eritrean-run organizations. Among these are the Eritrean American Community Association of Georgia, Eritrean American Community in the Washington D.C. metropolitan area, Eritrean Community Center of Greater New York, Eritrean American Community in Dallas, Eritrean Community Association in Chicago, Eritrean Community Center of Minnesota, Eritrean Association in Greater Seattle, and Eritrean American Community in Sacramento.

In 2001, a chapter of the Eritrean Liberation Front–Revolutionary Council was also established in Chicago. The National Union of Eritrean Women likewise routinely holds meetings and activities in the city.

Additionally, the Virginia-based Eritrean Sports Federation in North America (ERSFNA) annually hosts a soccer tournament for Eritrean residents. It also organizes adult and youth sports community programs in various U.S. cities.

The Eritrean Muslims Association in North America (EMANA) and Eritrean Muslims Council (EMC) serve the Eritrean community's Muslim adherents. Christians also gather in a number of Eritrean Orthodox, Protestant and Roman Catholic churches.

Notable people

Notable Eritrean-Americans:

Aminé - rapper
Azie Tesfai- Eritrean American actress, known for her television roles, including Jane the Virgin and Supergirl.
Nipsey Hussle (1985-2019)- Ermias Joseph Asghedom, known professionally as Nipsey Hussle, was partially Eritrean and an American rapper, songwriter, entrepreneur, community activist, philanthropist, and actor. 
Semhar Araia - Eritrean political activist, professor and international lawyer. 
Bereket Habteslassie - Eritrean American & Leading African scholar, freedom fighter, professor, international lawyer and political activist. 
Selamawi Asgedom - Eritrean-Ethiopian author and public speaker.
Asmeret Asefaw Berhe - soil biogeochemist and political ecologist 
Nat Berhe - partially Eritrean football player who is currently a free agent in the NFL; The first player of Eritrean descent drafted into the league.
Eriam Sisters - Eritrean musical group consisting of three sisters.
Haile Debas- physician and academic administrator at the University of California, San Francisco.
Haben Girma - Disability rights advocate, first deafblind graduate of Harvard Law School
Tiffany Haddish - partially Eritrean dancer, comedian and actress.
J Holiday - American born Eritrean partially  Singer
Meb Keflezighi - Eritrean athlete and long-distance runner.
Thomas Kelati - American-born Polish professional basketball player of Eritrean heritage.
Joe Neguse - Eritrean U.S. House of Representative from Colorado's 2nd congressional district.
Rubi Rose - rapper and model
Ella Thomas - partially Eritrean, Eritrean-born actress, model and producer.

See also

 Eritrean people
 Eritrea–United States relations
 Habesha peoples
 Ethiopian Americans

References

Further reading
 Hepner, Tricia Redeker. “Eritrean Immigrants.” Multicultural America: An Encyclopedia of the Newest Americans. Ed. Ronald H. Bayor, (Greenwood, 2001) pp 617–47. .
 Sorenson, John. “Discourses on Eritrean Nationalism and Identity.” Journal of Modern African Studies 29, no. 2 (1991): 301–17.
 Tesfagiorgis, Mussie G. Eritrea (Africa in Focus). (ABC-CLIO, 2011).
 Ockerstrom, Lolly. "Eritrean Americans." Gale Encyclopedia of Multicultural America, edited by Thomas Riggs, (3rd ed., vol. 2, Gale, 2014), pp. 87–96.  online

External links
Organization of Eritrean-Americans

 

 
 
Eritrean diaspora
Horn Africans in the United States
African-American society